McMinn Building is a historic commercial building located at Brevard, Transylvania County, North Carolina.  It was built in 1899, and is a two-story, rectangular brick building with robust decorative brickwork in the Italianate style.  It has three storefronts on the first floor, and offices on the second arranged in a "U"-shaped plan.

It was listed on the National Register of Historic Places in 1994. It is located in the Main Street Historic District.

References

Commercial buildings on the National Register of Historic Places in North Carolina
Italianate architecture in North Carolina
Commercial buildings completed in 1899
Buildings and structures in Transylvania County, North Carolina
National Register of Historic Places in Transylvania County, North Carolina
1899 establishments in North Carolina
Historic district contributing properties in North Carolina